The 2007 3M Performance 400 was the 23rd race in the 2007 NASCAR season was scheduled to be held on Sunday, August 19, 2007 at Michigan International Speedway in Brooklyn, Michigan.  However, a day-long rain postponed the race until August 20, but another rainstorm postponed the race until the following day.

Pre-race News
 Kenny Wallace was released from the No. 78 Furniture Row Racing Chevy team.  Wimmer replaced him, but failed to qualify in a one-race deal.
 Due to a hand injury to his hand suffered in a fit of anger when he punched out a wall in his hauler at the previous weekend's race in Watkins Glen, Kyle Petty was replaced in the No. 45 as Chad McCumbee for that race only.

Practice and qualifying
Kasey Kahne, with a speed of 187.544 mph, was fastest in practice. He was followed by Jimmie Johnson, David Stremme, Kyle Busch, and Matt Kenseth who rounded out the top five.

An early blow came in the first practice when Jeff Burton lost an engine minutes into the warmups.  As a result, the No. 31 Chevrolet started in the back of the field regardless of where he qualified.

In qualifying itself, newly formed Gillett Evernham Motorsports looked to turn its season around with an all GEM front row. However, those efforts were thwarted by that of Greg Biffle, who held the pole until Jeff Gordon, the final driver to qualify, took his 62nd career Bud Pole award. Of note, Michael Waltrip Racing placed two of its cars in the top 15 although Dale Jarrett failed to make the show.

Did not qualify: No. 36 – Jeremy Mayfield, No. 44 – Dale Jarrett, No. 78 – Scott Wimmer, No. 37 – Kevin Lepage, No. 84 – A. J. Allmendinger

Race
The two-day postponement because of weather was the first since the 1997 DieHard 500 at Talladega.  In that case, the race was run on the day before Mothers' Day, which was May 10. However, this race would be started on August 21 at 10:00 a.m.  With no rain scheduled until the afternoon, the race ran its full distance although NASCAR waved a competition caution for the drivers to adjust their cars.

Kurt Busch, driving a Dodge Charger, held off the Chevrolet Monte Carlos of Martin Truex Jr. and Jimmie Johnson, under a green-white-checkered finish, to take his second win in three races.  As with his earlier victory at Pocono, Busch led the most laps, 96 out of 203.

Gordon and Denny Hamlin, the top two drivers in the Cup standings, clinched places in the Chase for the Nextel Cup.  Busch remained in 12th place, but extended his lead over 13th place Dale Earnhardt Jr. to 163 points.

Also, Bill Davis Racing took back 35th place in the owners' standings for its No. 22 team on the strength of a sixth-place finish from Dave Blaney.  This meant that BDR was guaranteed a starting spot for the next race, the Sharpie 500.  Wood Brothers/JTG Racing (#21) fell back to 36th.  It was the third change for 35th, between these teams, since late July.

For the first time in the brief history of Toyota in the Cup Series, two of its drivers finished in the top 10 in the same race: Blaney and Brian Vickers (8th).

The race telecast, scheduled for ESPN, was relocated to ESPN2.

Results

References

External links
Complete finishing order
Points standings
Complete weather information

3M Performance 400
3M Performance 400
NASCAR races at Michigan International Speedway
August 2007 sports events in the United States